The Ninth Passenger is a 2018 American horror-thriller film. It is directed by Corey Large, who also stars along with Jesse Metcalfe, Alexia Fast, and Tom Maden.

Shot in Vancouver, Canada, the film was released in August 2018. The film follows a group of people aboard a luxury yacht on a spontaneous midnight sea voyage, pursued by an unknown passenger.

Cast
 Jesse Metcalfe as Brady
 Alexia Fast as Jess
 Veronica Dunne as Christy
 Tom Maden as Lance
 Sabina Gadecki as Tina
 Corey Large as Malcolm
 David Hennessey as Marty
 Cinta Laura Kiehl as Nicole
 Timothy V. Murphy as Silas
 Selwa Dahab as Becky
 Roy Campsall as The Creature

References

External links
 

2018 horror thriller films
American horror thriller films
Films set in the 21st century
2018 horror films
2010s English-language films
2010s American films